The Quay Quarter Tower is a skyscraper located at 50 Bridge Street, Sydney. Originally built as the AMP Centre in 1976, the structure underwent a redevelopment from 2018 to 2021 which increased its height, incorporated additional floorspace, and modernised the tower's entire form and design. The building re-opened as the Quay Quarter Tower in early 2022 and currently stands at a height of 216 meters (709 feet) with 54 floors.

History (AMP Centre) 
The tower in its original form as the AMP Centre was built in 1976, consisting of 45 floors. It was used for commercial office space and was made up of concrete, glass, and steel. Designed by Peddle Thorp & Walker and built by Mainline. The center's roof-height reached 188m, making it the tallest building in Sydney at the time of its completion, prior to the completion of the MLC Centre in 1977.

Redevelopment (Quay Quarter Tower)
In 2013 Australian architectural practice BVN designed a new masterplan for the Quay Quarter Sydney precinct and a “design envelope” for a new tower. Together with AMP Capital and City of Sydney the BVN architects ran a design competition for Quay Quarter Tower.

On 24 September 2014, the winning design from architect 3XN was revealed and BVN was appointed Executive Architect to collaborate with 3XN and develop their design concept for construction.

Approval for the project was finalised in November 2015 and construction began in early 2018.  Construction was contracted by Multiplex and involved a rebuild and reclad of the building's entire exterior; increasing its height, incorporating additional floorspace, and modernising its overall physical form, design and facade. The AMP Centre's internal core, along with 66% of its existing columns, beams and slabs and 95% of its internal walls, were retained as part of the redevelopment. The northern half of the structure was dismantled and a new section was built in its place, incorporating it with the existing core and the southern section of the building, which was also reclad in a new facade. This redevelopment resulted in a new height of 216m with 54 floors. During construction, key-tenant AMP relocated its headquarters in March 2018 into the AMP Building at 33 Alfred Street, while all other commercial tenants found premises elsewhere in the city. The building in its new form, now known as Quay Quarter Tower, topped out in early 2021, before its completion in early 2022.

In November 2022 the architects won the International High-Rise Award for Quay Quarter Tower, while in December of that year the building won the World Building of the Year Award at the World Architecture Festival.
 Quay Quarter Tower timelapse construction video

References

External links
 
 
 Video: Quay Quarter Tower by 3XN

Skyscrapers in Sydney
Office buildings completed in 1976
Office buildings in Sydney
Skyscraper office buildings in Australia
Sydney central business district